The fourth annual Nickelodeon Australian Kids' Choice Awards were held on 11 October 2006 at the Sydney Entertainment Centre in Sydney. The show was hosted by Sophie Monk, Dave Lawson and James Kerley. The nominees were announced on 10 August 2006 and closed on 20 September 2006.
Lindsay Lohan was originally lined up to host the 2006 awards, but was unable to attend. Bindi Irwin made her first public appearance at the 2006 awards ceremony since her father's (Steve Irwin) memorial service.

Nominees and winners
Winners in Bold

Music

Fave Australian Artist
 Shannon Noll
 Ricki-Lee Coulter
 Lee Harding
 Guy Sebastian

Fave Australian Group
 Young Divas
 Living End
 The Veronicas
 Rogue Traders

Fave International Artist
 Hilary Duff
 Chris Brown
 Nick Lachey
 Rihanna

Fave International Group
 Green Day
 The Black Eyed Peas
 Simple Plan
 Good Charlotte

Fave Song
 When It All Falls Apart - The Veronicas
 Forever Young - Youth Group
 Voodoo Child - Rogue Traders
 This Time I Know It's for Real - Young Divas

Movies

Fave Movie
 Harry Potter and the Goblet of Fire
 She's the Man
 High School Musical
 Ice Age: The Meltdown

Fave Movie Star (male)
 Daniel Radcliffe
 Hugh Jackman
 Jack Black
 Rupert Grint

Fave Movie Star (female)
 Hilary Duff
 Emma Watson
 Lindsay Lohan
 Amanda Bynes

TV

Fave Toon
 SpongeBob SquarePants
 The Simpsons
 Fairly OddParents
 Kim Possible

Fave TV Show
 Blue Water High
 Home and Away
 Drake & Josh
 Neighbours

Fave TV Star
 Kate Ritchie
 Stephanie McIntosh
 Chris Hemsworth
 Grant Denyer

People

Fave Aussie
 Guy Sebastian
 Ian Thorpe
 Anthony Callea
 Nicole Kidman

Fave Celeb Duo
 Kath & Kim
 Dave Lawson and James Kerley
 Rebecca Cartwright and Lleyton Hewitt
 The Veronicas

Funniest Person
 James Kerley
 Dave Lawson
 James Mathison
 Rove McManus

Fave Old Fart
 Ian "Dicko" Dickson
 Daryl Somers
 David "Kochie" Koch
 Bert Newton

Fave Sports Star (female)
 Libby Lenton
 Alicia Molik
 Leisel Jones
 Liz Ellis

Fave Sports Star (male)
 Grant Hackett
 Lucas Neill
 Brett Lee
 Lleyton Hewitt

Hotties

Fave Hottie (female)
 Stephanie McIntosh
 Natalie Bassingthwaighte
 Lara Bingle
 Isabel Lucas

Fave Hottie (male)
 Lee Harding
 Dan O'Connor
 Chris Hemsworth
 Adam Saunders

So Hot Right Now
 Australian Idol
 The Socceroos
 Young Divas
 WWE

Random

Fave Book
 Harry Potter Series
 The Chronicles of Narnia
 A Series of Unfortunate Events
 Anthony Callea: The Official Story

Fave Console Game
 PSP - Loco Roco
 PS2 – Buzz!: The Big Quiz
 PS2 – Tony Hawk's American Wasteland
 Nintendo DS - Nintendogs

Fave Podcast
 Camp Orange Maudecast
 Bus Stop Sarvo
 MuggleCast
 Hamish and Andy

References

Nickelodeon Kids' Choice Awards
2006 awards
2006 in Australian television
2000s in Sydney